"Drew Barrymore" is a song by American rapper and singer Bryce Vine. Through a virtual appearance on one of The Kelly Clarkson Show's first episodes, Drew Barrymore herself told Bryce that she was a fan of both him and Kelly.

Background 
Bryce says he chose Drew as the ideal metaphor after seeing her on The Wedding Singer. He said that Drew is "kind of Hollywood royalty, but she's kind of a badass, but she's kind of sweet".

Music Video
The music video for the song was released in 2018 and featured actress Christian Serratos.

Charts

Weekly charts

Year-end charts

Certifications

References

2018 singles
2018 songs
Bryce Vine songs
Songs written by Julia Michaels
Songs written by Sir Nolan
Drew Barrymore
Songs about actors